Dada Lakhmi Chand, also known as Pandit Lakhmi Chand, was an Indian poet of Haryanvi language. He was given the title of 'Pandit'. He was also known as  the Kalidas of Haryana. He has been accorded the honor of the 'Surya Har' of Haryanvi music genre Raagni and Saang. He is popularly referred to as 'Dada Lakhmi Chand' out of respect. His work is filled with songs containing messages on moral values, which earned him respect in all corners of Haryana and was called ahead of his time

Recently , movie 'DADA LAKHMI ' portraying life story of Pt. Lakhmichand was released which was directed by Yashpal Sharma.

Early life
Dada Lakhmi Chand was a great poet. Lakhmi Chand was born in Janti Kalan in a  Gaur Brahmin family, a village located in Sonepat district of Haryana. His father was an ordinary farmer. He had to resist his family's opposition to enter the field of art. He is usually considered as illiterate yet a great of poet of Haryanvi language.

He used to sing various stories with great morals in his 'Raagni' and basically gave a message to live a good lifestyle through skits called Saang. He also used to entertain people through his acts Saang in the native language. His widely popular work is'Lakhmichand Ka Brahmgyaan' that has been sung by various Haryanvi artists after his death.

Writings
His writings have a marked influence on contemporary culture and society of Haryana. Annually, Haryana Kala Parishad confers Pandit Lakhmi Chand Award to people for their contributions to Haryanvi literature. Shri Lakhmichand made following Saangs: 

1) Raja Harishchander

2) Shahi Lakadhara

3) Jyani Chor

4) Seth Tarachand

5) Satyewan Savitri

6) Heer Ranjha

7) Chap Singh Somwati

8) Raja Gopichand

9) Bhup Puranjan

10) Meera Bai

11) Bhagat Puranmal

12) Hiramal Jamal

13) Raghubir Dharamkaur

14) Chaanderkiran

References

Folk artists from Haryana
Poets from Haryana
20th-century Indian poets
Indian male poets
20th-century Indian male writers